Alpha-1,2-glucosyltransferase ALG10-A is an enzyme that in humans is encoded by the ALG10 gene. It is a member of the Dolichyl-P-Glc:Glc2Man9GlcNAc2-PP-dolichol alpha-1,2-glucosyltransferase class of enzymes.

Function
This gene encodes a membrane-associated protein that adds the third glucose residue to the lipid-linked oligosaccharide precursor for N-linked glycosylation. That is, it transfers the terminal glucose from dolichyl phosphate glucose (Dol-P-Glc) onto the lipid-linked oligosaccharide Glc2Man9GlcNAc(2)-PP-Dol. The rat protein homolog was shown to specifically modulate the gating function of the rat neuronal ether-a-go-go (EAG) potassium ion channel.

References